The Afghan identity card or Afghan Tazkira is a national identity document that is issued upon request to every Afghan citizen or national, whether such individual resides inside or outside of Afghanistan. It serves as proof of identity and residency but more importantly Afghan nationality. The document is issued by the National Statistics and Information Authority (NSIA), which has offices in all provinces of Afghanistan.

The Afghan Tazkira, which is older than 100 years, has been modernized in recent years. The electronic identification (e-ID) card campaign was officially launched in Kabul in May of 2018 when then-President Ashraf Ghani and First Lady Rula Ghani received their cards. Distribution of the e-ID cards or e-Tazkiras later began in other parts of Afghanistan. The e-Tazkira complies with international standards for identity documents. As of November 2022, over 8 million Afghan nationals have obtained their e-Tazkiras. This includes the Afghans that are temporarily residing in Iran and in the United Arab Emirates (UAE).

Procedure

In order to obtain an Afghan e-Tazkira, an application must be submitted inside the office of Afghanistan's Ministry of Interior Affairs or electronically using the internet. The processing fee is 300 Afghanis (Afs) inside Afghanistan, but €10 euros in Europe and $10 in America. The e-Tazkia cards are issued by the NSIA. Evidence that the applicant is in fact a national and citizen of Afghanistan is required. This can be proven by providing older Afghan paper identification. If the applicant does not have such a document, then he or she must bring family members, relatives or witnesses willing to testify. Applicants below 18 years old must be accompanied by their parents or legal guardians before the application can be processed.

Characteristics 

The Afghan e-Tazkira is a polycarbonate card and rectangular in shape, about 86 × 54 millimeters in size. On one side is a gold-plated contact chip, and on the right-hand side is the small photograph of the bearer, personal information is available in English on the same side. On the top of the card on both sides, the name Afghanistan is written in three languages, Pashto, Dari and English. On the back side is personal information about the bearer in two languages Pashto and Dari. It can be used as a smart card. In May 2022, the Afghan government announced plans to issue e-Tazkira cards with a new design bearing the emblem of the Islamic Emirate of Afghanistan.

Printed data 
The descriptions of the fields are printed in Pashto, Dari and English.

 Given name
 Surname
 Personal Id. No.
 Holder's signature
 Place of birth
 Date of birth
 Authority
 Date of issue
 Date of expiry

A machine readable zone is printed on the bottom of the back-side of the card.

See also
Afghan passport
Afghan nationality law

References

External links
National Statistic and Information Authority (NSIA) 
Sample of the new Afghan computerized identity card
https://www.justice.gov/eoir/page/file/1135641/download
http://www.asan.gov.af/Eng/AsaanDetails.aspx?ID=16197

Government of Afghanistan
Afghanistan